The 2009 McDonald's All-American Boys Game was an All-star basketball game played on Wednesday, April 1, 2009, at the BankUnited Center in Coral Gables, Florida, home of the University of Miami Hurricanes. The game's rosters featured the best and most highly rated high school boys graduating in 2009. The game was the 32nd annual version of the McDonald's All-American Game, first played in 1978.

The 48 players were selected from 2,500 nominees by a committee of basketball experts. They were chosen not only for their on-court skills but for their performances off the court as well. Coach Morgan Wootten, who had more than 1,200 wins as head basketball coach at DeMatha High School, was chairman of the selection committee. Legendary UCLA coach John Wooden, who has been involved in the McDonald's All-American Games since its inception, served as chairman of the Games and as an advisor to the selection committee.

Proceeds from the 2009 McDonald's All American High School Basketball Games went to Ronald McDonald House Charities (RMHC) of South Florida and its Ronald McDonald House program.

2009 Game 
The 2009 game was held at the BankUnited Center on the University of Miami’s Coral Gables campus. The game was played on April 1, 2009 and was nationally televised on ESPN.

Top contributors to the East victory were John R. Wooden MVP Award winner Derrick Favors, with 19 points and eight rebounds, and Dante Taylor (Pittsburgh), with 15 points and six rebounds. Lance Stephenson added a solid performance that consisted of 12 points, four rebounds, six assists and three steals. Peyton Siva (Louisville) compiled nine assists.

The West Team used a balanced offensive attack that resulted with six players scoring in double figures. Keith Gallon (Oklahoma) was the top performer for the West Squad in both points (20) and rebounds (7), while Naismith Sportsmanship Award winner Avery Bradley, Jr. (Texas) tallied 15 points and six rebounds. John Henson (North Carolina) shot 70% from the field, which led to 14 points.

The East Team came back from an eight-point halftime deficit, due in large part to strong second half shooting (60%) and a 19-point advantage from their bench players. The 113-110 victory increases the East’s lead to 18-14 in the overall series.

2009 West Roster

2009 East Roster

Coaches 
The West team was coached by:
 Head Coach Pat Clatchey of Mount St. Joseph High School (Baltimore, Maryland)
 Asst Coach Brett Davis (coach)
 Asst Coach Doug Nicholas

The East team was coached by:
 Co-Head Coach Darryl Burrows of Dillard High School (Fort Lauderdale, Florida)
 Co-Head Coach Mark Lieberman of Monsignor Edward Pace High School (Miami Gardens, Florida)
 Asst Coach Derek Heard

Boxscore

Visitors: West

Home: East 

(* = Starting Line-up)

All-American Week

Schedule 

 Tuesday, March 31: Powerade Jamfest
 Slam Dunk Contest
 Three-Point Shoot-out
 Timed Basketball Skills Competition
 Wednesday, April 1: 32nd Annual Boys All-American Game

The Powerade JamFest is a skills-competition evening featuring basketball players who demonstrate their skills in three crowd-entertaining ways. The slam dunk contest was first held in 1987, and a 3-point shooting challenge was added in 1989. This year, for the first time, a timed basketball skills competition was added to the schedule of events.

Contest Winners 
 The 2009 Powerade Slam Dunk contest was won by Avery Bradley Jr.
 Ryan Kelly was winner of the 2009 3-point shoot-out.
 The inaugural winner of the basketball skills competition was Dante Taylor.

See also 
2009 McDonald's All-American Girls Game

References

External links 
 McDonald's All-American on the web

2008–09 in American basketball
2009
Basketball competitions in Florida
Sports in Coral Gables, Florida
2009 in sports in Florida
Events in Coral Gables, Florida